Alias Avidzba is the current and first Chairman of the State Committee for Youth Policy of Abkhazia. Avidzba was appointed on 11 April 2015 by President Raul Khajimba — up until that point, Youth Policy had been part of the Ministry for Education.

References

Living people
Chairmen of the State Committee for Youth Policy of Abkhazia
Year of birth missing (living people)